Eugène de Pousargues (21 October 1859 – 24 January  1901) was a French zoologist born in Saint-Omer (Pas-de-Calais).

From 1885 he was an assistant to Alphonse Milne-Edwards (1835–1900), and served as préparateur at the Laboratoire de Mammalogie of the Muséum national d'histoire naturelle in Paris. He died of septicaemia contracted when performing a dissection.

He was the author of a treatise on mammals from the French Congo titled "Étude sur les mammifères du Congo français" (1897), and with Milne-Edwards, he was co-author of "Le rhinopithèque de la vallée du Haut Mékong (rhinopithecus bieti, A. M.-E.)", (The snub-nosed monkey from the valley of the Upper Mekong River; 1898). He also published scientific papers on Thorold's deer, the black-footed mongoose and on new gibbon and guenon species.

An African carnivore known as Pousargues's mongoose, Dologale dybowskii (Pousargues, 1893), is named after him.

References 
 Biographical information of this article is based on a translation of an equivalent article at the French Wikipedia, source listed as: Philip and Edward R. Jaussaud Brygoo (2004). Du Jardin au Muséum en 516 biographies. Muséum national d’histoire naturelle de Paris : 630 p.

French zoologists
People from Saint-Omer
1901 deaths
1859 births
Deaths from sepsis